The épuration légale (French "legal purge") was the wave of official trials that followed the Liberation of France and the fall of the Vichy regime. The trials were largely conducted from 1944 to 1949, with subsequent legal action continuing for decades afterward.

Unlike the Nuremberg Trials, the épuration légale was conducted as a domestic French affair. Approximately 300,000 cases were investigated, reaching into the highest levels of the collaborationist Vichy government. More than half were closed without indictment. From 1944 to 1951, official courts in France sentenced 6,763 people to death (3,910 in absentia) for treason and other offenses. Only 791 executions were carried out, including those of Pierre Laval, Joseph Darnand, and the journalist Robert Brasillach; far more common was "national degradation" — a loss of civil rights, which was meted out to 49,723 people.

Immediately following the liberation, France was swept by a wave of executions, public humiliations, assaults and detentions of suspected collaborators, known as the épuration sauvage (wild purge). This period succeeded the German occupational administration but preceded the authority of the French Provisional Government, and consequently lacked any form of institutional justice. Reliable statistics of the death toll do not exist. At the low end, one estimate is that approximately 10,500 were executed, before and after liberation. "The courts of Justice pronounced about 6,760 death sentences, 3,910 in absentia and 2,853 in the presence of the accused. Of these 2,853, 73 percent were commuted by de Gaulle, and 767 carried out. In addition, about 770 executions were ordered by the military tribunals. Thus the total number of people executed before and after the Liberation was approximately 10,500, including those killed in the épuration sauvage", notably including members and leaders of the milices. US forces put the number of "summary executions" following liberation at 80,000. The French Minister of the Interior in March 1945 claimed that the number executed was 105,000.

Background 

The term purge had been used earlier by de Gaulle under different circumstances. When the Allies arrived in November 1942, North Africa supported Vichy. In 1942, before the Allied landings in North Africa, there were two French organizations opposed to the Vichy regime— the Free French under General de Gaulle from London and Brazzaville, and the French armed forces in North Africa under the Civil and Military Command of North Africa headed by Henri Giraud in Algiers. Giraud had assumed command upon the assassination of François Darlan, formerly Prime Minister under Philippe Petain's Vichy regime. By March 1943, Giraud started to become more critical of Vichy (notably in a speech written by advisor Jean Monnet). By June, the two branches of Free France merged into one, creating the French Committee of National Liberation.

Context 

Following the liberation of France, the Provisional Government of the French Republic (GPRF) led by Charles de Gaulle was faced with rebuilding the country and removing traitors, criminals and collaborators from office. The French Committee of National Liberation (CFLN), which became the GPRF on 4 June 1944, issued an ordinance in Algiers on 18 August 1943, setting the basis for the judicial purge and establishing a Purge Commission (Commission d'Epuration).

The official purge in metropolitan France began in early 1945, although isolated civil trials, courts martial, and thousands of extra-legal vigilante actions had already been carried out through 1944, as the nation had been freed. Women accused of "horizontal collaboration" were arrested, shaved, exhibited, and sometimes mauled by crowds after Liberation, as punishment for their sexual relationships with Germans during the occupation.

In another example of action before the purge, following the landings in North Africa in November 1942, some important civil servants loyal to Vichy, including Pierre Pucheu, former Minister of the Interior, had been detained. Pucheu was indicted for treason by a military court martial at the end of August 1943, and his trial started on 4 March 1944.  He was executed 20 days later.

Organized implementation of the official purge was made difficult by the lack of untainted magistrates.  With a single exception, all of the Third Republic's surviving judges had taken an oath to the disgraced regime of Marshal Philippe Pétain.

Three major types of civilian courts were set up:
 the High Court of Justice (Haute Cour de justice)
 the Courts of Justice, modeled on the Cour d'assises (Assize Court)
 the "Civic Chambers" (Chambres civiques).

A fourth category was the military courts martial. This jurisdiction covered French citizens charged with pro-German military acts, and German nationals charged with war crimes, such as Pierre Pucheu, Minister of the Interior of Vichy, and Otto Abetz, ambassador of Nazi Germany to Paris.

The High Court judged 108 persons (including 106 Ministers). In total the courts investigated more than 300,000 people, classifying 180,000 of them without any indictment, and finally fewer than 800 executions were enacted. Three successive general amnesties were enacted, in 1947, 1951 and 1953.

Legal basis 

While the laws of 1939 included provisions against treason, the particular nature of events related to the Occupation of France made a number of offenses legally unclear, such as joining the SS or the paramilitary Milice. Hence, exceptional legal procurements were made.  The principles set unanimously by the National Council of Resistance ( CNR) on 15 March 1944 called for the political elimination of any person guilty of collaboration with the Nazis between 16 June 1940 and the Liberation. Such offences included, notably:

 Taking part in collaborationist organizations or parties
 Taking part in propaganda
 Delation (denunciation)
 Any form of zeal in favor of the Germans
 Black market activities

On the other hand, preventing a civil war meant that competent civil servants should not be taken out of office, and that moderate sentences should be given where possible. More importantly, this prevented local Resistance movements from doing vigilante "justice" themselves, ending the "combative" period of the Liberation and restoring the proper legal institutions of France. These new institutions were set on three principles:
 Illegality of the Vichy regime
 France still being at war with Nazi Germany: the Franco-German armistice legally called for a cease fire and an end to military operations, but did not end the state of war, and no peace treaty was signed with Germany. Hence, it remained the duty of any French to resist occupation.
 Retroactivity of the new texts

On 26 August 1944, the government published an order defining the offence of indignité nationale ("national unworthiness"), and the corresponding punishment of dégradation nationale ("national stripping of rank"). Indignité nationale was characterised as "harming the unity of France and neglecting one's national duty", and the sentence aimed in particular at prohibiting guilty individuals from exercising political functions.

Courts of Justice 

On 18 November, the High Court of Justice was created, with the aim of judging members of the Vichy government charged with offences of Indignité nationale (Marshal Philippe Pétain, etc.). Other suspects were judged by the "Courts of Justice" (French: Cours de justice). A High Court of Justice already existed under the Third Republic: the Senate was then to organise a court to judge state leaders guilty of high treason. But this form of justice had been suppressed by Marshal Pétain's Fifth Constitutional Act of 30 July 1940, establishing the Vichy regime.

The new High Court was no longer composed of senators, but presided over by the first President of the Court of Cassation, assisted by the President of the Criminal Chamber of the Court of Cassation and by the first President of the Appeal Court of Paris. It was also composed of 24 jurors, randomly chosen from two lists, with a dozen from each list. The first list included 40 senators or deputies in function on 1 September 1939, who had not voted full powers to Pétain on 10 July 1940 (the Vichy 80). The second list was composed of 50 persons chosen by the Provisional Consultative Assembly in Resistance movements.

The composition of the High Court was changed again by the 27 December 1945 Act. Thereafter, it was composed of 27 members, i.e. 3 magistrates and 24 jurors randomly chosen from a list of 96 deputies of the Constituent Assembly, elected on 21 October 1945. Each political party was represented on this list in proportion to its presence in the Assembly.

The High Court was further modified by the 15 September 1947 Act, and then again by the 19 April 1948 Act.

Internment of accused 

The French concentration camps used by the Vichy regime to intern Jews, Gipsies, Spanish Republicans, Resistants and others, were now used to detain presumed collaborationists. In Paris, these included the Velodrome d'Hiver, the Drancy internment camp (managed by the Resistance until the arrival of the gendarmerie on 15 September 1944) and the Fresnes prison, which held Tino Rossi, Pierre Benoit, Arletty, and the industrialist Louis Renault.  The 4 October 1944 ordinance authorised prefects to intern dangerous prisoners until the end of hostilities.  For some Collaborationists, internment meant protection from popular vengeance.

On 31 October 1944, the Minister of Interior Adrien Tixier created commissions charged with controlling the internment camps and home confinements. The Red Cross was permitted to visit the camps.  Tixier then stated on 30 August 1945 that although the war was not yet officially ended, further internments were prohibited except for cases of spying or major black marketeering. The 10 May 1946 Act fixed the legal date of the end of the war, and at the end of May 1946, all internment camps were cleared.

Trials 

The first high official tried in the purge was Jean-Pierre Esteva, Resident General of France in Tunisia. He was sentenced to detention for life on 15 March 1945, avoiding capital punishment because the court recognised that he had assisted patriots in May 1943, just before quitting Tunisia. In state of illness, Esteva was pardoned on 11 August 1950 and died a few months later.

The trial of Pétain began on 23 July 1945. Pétain's defense lawyer, Jacques Isorni, pointed out that the public prosecutor, André Mornet, had also been in charge of the failed Riom Trials organized by Pétain under the Vichy regime. This may not have impressed the judge, Pierre Mongibeaux, who had sworn allegiance to Petain in 1941. The 89-year-old Marshal was sentenced to death on 15 August but the sentence was commuted to life imprisonment. He lived six more years, banished to the Île d'Yeu.

Pierre Laval, the French Prime Minister from July to December 1940 and from April 1942 to August 1944, had fled to Francoist Spain. Franco sent him back to Innsbruck in Austria, which was part of the U.S. Occupation Zone. Laval was handed over to the French authorities and his trial started in October 1945.  In a hasty, rancorous trial, he was sentenced by an openly hostile jury to death on 9 October 1945 and executed a week later.

By 1 July 1949, the High Court had given out 108 sentences, 106 against former ministers:
 Eight defendants died before their trials and their judicial proceedings were stopped, including that of Jean Bichelonne.
 Three persons, including Marcel Peyrouton, were acquitted and 42 were given non-lieux (similar to acquittals), including Jacques Le Roy Ladurie and Jérôme Carcopino, Minister of National Education in François Darlan's cabinet (1941–1942).
 Eighteen were sentenced to death, of whom three were carried out on Pierre Laval, Milice leader Joseph Darnand and Fernand de Brinon, representative of the Vichy government to the German High Command in Paris and state secretary.  Five sentences were commuted, among them Pétain, Henri Dentz, commander of the Army of the Levant and Raphaël Alibert, signatory of the first Law on the status of Jews. Ten others were condemned to death in absentia (including Louis Darquier de Pellepoix, Commissioner for Jewish Affairs).
 Eight men were sentenced to forced labour, Jacques Chevalier, Minister Paul Baudoin, Charles Nogues, Minister Gabriel Auphan, Minister Hubert Lagardelle and others.
 Fourteen were imprisoned, including Yves Bouthillier, André Marquis, préfet maritime of Toulon, Bléhaut Henri and others; a life sentence was given to Jean-Pierre Esteva.
 Fifteen sentences of dégradation nationale were issued, including François Piétri, Vichy ambassador to Spain, and Adrien Marquet. Seven of the sentences were suspended for compensating "acts of Resistance", including those of Jean Ybarnegaray and André Parmentier.

Between 1954 and 1960, the High Court judged prisoners who had been sentenced in absentia or had been taken prisoner. More than a decade having passed, the court showed more leniency. For example, the General resident of Morocco, Charles Noguès, had been sentenced in absentia to 20 years of forced labour on 28 November 1947 but his indignité nationale was immediately suspended on 26 October 1956.

See also 
 Raymond Abellio, condemned in absentia to 20 years of prison, granted amnesty in 1952
 Jacques de Bernonville, sentenced to capital punishment in absentia
 Abel Bonnard, Minister of National Education under Vichy, condemned in absentia to death, granted political asylum by Franco.
 René Bousquet, granted amnesty (judged in the early 1980s, along with Jean Leguay, for his role in the Vel' d'Hiv Roundup of July 1942)
 Robert Brasillach, anti-Semitic journalist, executed in February 1945
 Marcel Bucard, leader of the Mouvement Franciste, executed in 1946
 Louis-Ferdinand Céline, writer, convicted in absentia to one year of prison and dégradation nationale, then granted amnesty
 Marcel Déat, founder of the National Popular Rally (RNP), sentenced to capital punishment in absentia
 Émile Dewoitine, condemned in absentia, fled to Argentina
 Roland Gaucher, condemned to five years of prison
 Yann Goulet, sentenced to death in absentia, fled to the Republic of Ireland and became an Irish citizen in 1952
 Roparz Hemon, imprisoned for one year and given a ten years indignité nationale sentence
 Alan Heusaff, sentenced to death in absentia, fled to the Republic of Ireland and was amnestied in 1967
 Jean Hérold-Paquis, broadcaster on Radio Paris, executed
 Etienne Léandri, fought under the uniform of the Gestapo, but was not judged
 Jean Mamy, film director and journalist, condemned to death and executed at the fortress of Montrouge on 29 March 1949 
 Charles Maurras, given a life sentence in January 1945, released in 1952 for health reasons
 Maurice Papon, police administrator, escaped judgment by a CDL, finally found guilty of crimes against humanity in the 1990s
 Henri-Robert Petit, former editor-in-chief of the Collaborationist newspaper Le Pilori, condemned in November 1947 in absentia to 20 years of prison and dégradation nationale. Granted amnesty in 1959
 Lucien Rebatet, sentenced to capital punishment in 1946, commuted to forced labour in 1947, amnestied in 1952
 Paul Touvier, sentenced to capital punishment in absentia, arrested in 1989 and judged for crimes against humanity
 Xavier Vallat, granted amnesty

References

External links 
This Picture Tells a Tragic Story of What Happened to Women After D-Day - Time Magazine

French collaboration during World War II
Legal history of Vichy France
Political and cultural purges
Aftermath of World War II in France
Political history of France
Legal history of France
1944 in case law
1940s in France
World War II war crimes trials